Pacifier Live is a live album by Shihad (then-performing as Pacifier), which was recorded on their August 2003 tour of their homeland New Zealand. It was issued on 2×CD on 23 November 2003 via WEA with an additional 1000 copies on vinyl. Pacifier Live reached the top 10 on the New Zealand albums chart.

Track listing

Disc 1
 "You Again" - 5:11
 "Gimme Gimme" - 5:29
 "Run" - 3:52
 "Semi Normal" - 3:12
 "Wait And See" - 5:02
 "La La Land" - 2:53
 "Bullitproof" - 3:31
 "Derail" - 4:28
 "Bitter" - 4:00
 "Everything" - 4:55
 "The Brightest Star" - 3:05
 "My Mind's Sedate" - 3:14

Disc 2
 "Comfort Me" - 3:15
 "Interconnector" - 2:48
 "Ghost From The Past" - 2:49
 "Deb's Night Out" - 4:11
 "The General Electric" - 6:18
 "Pacifier" - 4:10
 "Toxic Shock" - 3:48
 "Screwtop" - 6:05
 "The Call" - 4:40
 "Thin White Line" - 3:20
 "A Day Away" - 2:44
 "Home Again" - 4:40

Certifications

References 

Shihad albums
2003 live albums
Warner Music Group live albums